WDNY may refer to:

 United States District Court for the Western District of New York
 WDNY (AM), a radio station (1400 AM) licensed to serve Dansville, New York, United States
 WDNY-FM, a radio station (93.9 FM) licensed to serve Dansville, New York

See also

 
 Udny (disambiguation)
 KDNY-LP
 DNY (disambiguation)